Siphonochilus is a genus of plants native to sub-Saharan Africa.

 Siphonochilus aethiopicus (Schweinf.) B.L.Burtt - widespread from Ethiopia west to Sierra Leone and south to South Africa
 Siphonochilus bambutiorum A.D.Poulsen & Lock - Zaïre
 Siphonochilus brachystemon (K.Schum.) B.L.Burtt - eastern Africa from Sudan to Mozambique
 Siphonochilus kilimanensis (Gagnep.) B.L.Burtt - Mozambique
 Siphonochilus kirkii (Hook.f.) B.L.Burtt - eastern and central Africa from Sudan and Central African Republic south to South Africa
 Siphonochilus longitubus Lock - Zambia
 Siphonochilus nigericus (Hutch. ex Hepper) B.L.Burtt - Nigeria, Ghana
 Siphonochilus parvus Lock - Tanzania, Zambia, Malawi
 Siphonochilus pleianthus (K.Schum.) Lock - Zaïre, Angola, Zambia
 Siphonochilus puncticulatus (Gagnep.) Lock - Zaïre, Angola, Zambia
 Siphonochilus rhodesicus (T.C.E.Fr.) Lock - Tanzania, Zambia, Malawi, Zaïre

References

Siphonochilus
Zingiberaceae genera